Scopula actuaria is a moth of the family Geometridae. It was described by Francis Walker in 1861. It is found throughout the Oriental tropics of India, Sri Lanka, from Afghanistan and Taiwan to the southern Moluccas and Timor. It is also found on the Chagos Archipelago.

Description
There is a black speck at the end of the cell of each wing. The bands are reduced to minutely waved lines. The medial line excurved beyond cell of forewings, the postmedial slightly angled at vein 4 and 6 of each wing.

There is some variability in the ornamentation of the male eighth sternite throughout its range, even within a single locality.

The larvae have been recorded on Theobroma species.

Subspecies
Scopula actuaria actuaria
Scopula actuaria nigranalis (Warren, 1896) (Timor)
Scopula actuaria sheljuzhkoi Wiltshire, 1967 (Oriental tropics to Taiwan, Afghanistan)

References

External links

The Moths of Borneo

Moths of Asia
Moths described in 1861
actuaria